Ping-pong recording (also called ping-ponging, bouncing tracks, or reduction mixing) is a method of sound recording. It involves combining multiple track stems into one, allowing more room for overdubbing when using tape recorders with a limited set of tracks. It is also used to simplify mixdowns.

The two most common methods consist of 
 Dubbing tracks between two tape recorders (or tracks on a multitrack recorder) connected through a mixing console
 Dubbing tracks internally, through the onboard mixer of many machines, including Portastudios and similar multitrackers. 

In both cases, a new instrument, voice, or other material may be added with each bounce, depending on the setup's mixing capabilities.

In analog recording, the audio quality normally decreases with each generation, while in digital recording, the quality is usually preserved. In either case, the most leeway comes with having the best possible source material.

Early examples
The method was employed by Beach Boys co-founder Brian Wilson during the 1960s. For the recording of Pet Sounds (1966), Wilson created the instrumentals of songs using a 4-track recorder. He then bounced the material onto one track of an 8-track recorder, using the remaining tracks for vocal overdubs. This meant that the album could not be suitably mixed in stereo, because the instrumental parts were locked in monaural. In 1997, advances in recording technology allowed engineer Mark Linett to resync the original first-generation instrumental stems with the second-generation overdubbed vocals for the compilation The Pet Sounds Sessions.

Other terms
Ping pong is also a term of derision, in particular applied to early commercial stereo recordings of the late 1950s to mid-1960s which do not have a convincing stereo image or sound-stage. Such recordings were often made in two-track form for mixing in mono, but released as authentic stereo recordings.

References

Audio engineering
Sound recording